Mastermind, Master Mind or The Mastermind may refer to:

Fictional characters
 Mastermind (Jason Wyngarde), a fictional supervillain in Marvel Comics, a title also held by his daughters:
 Martinique Jason, the first daughter and successor of the Mastermind.
 Lady Mastermind, the second daughter and successor of the Mastermind.
 Mastermind (computer), a character in Marvel Comics' Captain Britain.
 Mastermind, an enemy of the Challengers of the Unknown in DC Comics.
 The Mastermind, a title for the main antagonists of each game of the Danganronpa series.

Literature
 "Master Mind" (comics), a comic strip in British comic Buster
 Mastermind: How to Think Like Sherlock Holmes, a 2013 non-fiction book by Maria Konnikova
 Masterminds, a novel series by Gordon Korman

Film and TV

Films
 Master Minds (1949 film), a 1949 American comedy film in The Bowery Boys series
 Mastermind (1976 film), a Charlie Chan spoof feature film, released in 1976
 Masterminds (1997 film), an American action comedy
 Masterminds (2013 film), a direct to DVD film
 Masterminds (2016 film), an American comedy film 
 The Master Mind (1914 film), an American crime/drama film, based on a 1913 play
 The Master Mind (1920 film), a lost American silent crime drama, also based on the play
 Wallander: Mastermind, a 2005 Swedish film
 Master Mind (2015 film), an Indian Kannada-language film
 Master Mind, the original title of 2010 film Megamind

Television
 Mastermind (British game show), a British quiz show
Mastermind India, an Indian quiz show based on the British show 
 Mastermind (Irish game show), an Irish quiz show based on the British show
Mastermind (Australian game show), an Australian version of the show
 Masterminds (Canadian TV series), a true crime documentary
 Masterminds (quiz bowl), an American TV show
 Master Minds (game show), a successor to Best Ever Trivia Show
 Mastermind (audio drama), a 2013 Doctor Who drama

Music
 Mastermind (American band), a progressive rock band 
 Dr. Mastermind, an American heavy metal band
 Herbie the Mastermind, a British DJ

Albums
 Mastermind (Tina Cousins album), 2005
 Mastermind (Monster Magnet album), 2010 
 Mastermind (Rick Ross album), 2014
 Mastermind (EP), by Beast, 2010

Songs
 "Mastermind", a song by Mike Oldfield from the 1999 album The Millennium Bell 
 "Mastermind", a song by Mindless Self Indulgence from the 2008 album If 
 "Mastermind", a song by Megadeth from the 1997 album Cryptic Writings
 "Mastermind", a song by Deltron 3030 from the 2000 album Deltron 3030
 Mastermind (song), a song by Taylor Swift from the 2022 album Midnights

Other uses
 Mastermind (board game), a classic board game
 Mastermind (role variant), in the Keirsey Temperament Sorter 
 Mastermind Toys, a Canadian chain of toy stores
 Mastermind School, in Dhaka, Bangladesh

See also

 Genius (disambiguation)
 Mastermind group, a peer-to-peer mentoring concept
 Criminal mastermind, or crime boss